Parvaneh Soltani (born October 12, 1961 in Tehran, Iran) is an Iranian playwright, theatre director and actress who lives in London.

Background
Parvaneh's father was an activist and her mother a poet and homemaker. She grew up in a poetry and political household that adored the leftwing of Iran and their ideologies and poetry. Through her father's acceptance of left wing ideologies came an acceptance of a form of liberal feminism. Her father encouraged his daughters to “be a free woman”. She studied BA in theatre at Dramatic University in Tehran.
Life and work in the West
Parvaneh left Iran in 1985 because of the political situation. It was about this time that the Iranian Revolution occurred. As an effect of the political restructuring after the revolution, she came into London and began studying Media. Eventually, she went in London College of Printing to study MA in Film.
In London to find her voice, she contributed in radio and magazines in Europe. In 1990 she began to work with Iraj Janati Attaie, playwright and a theatre director in an epic story called another Roastam another Sfandiyar with Behrooz Vosooghi the famous Iranian Co- Star. They have performed that play in numerous countries, including England, most European Cities, Canada and the United States.
In 2000, she formed Nina Theatre Company in London. Since then she wrote, directed and performed many successful plays. Those plays have been performed in London, Canada, and toured to several cities in Europe.
Also in 2000 she joined the Artists in Exile company in London.

The first mature play she adapted, performed and directed by herself was A Woman Alone, and then she wrote the successful play based on many true stories in political prisoners in Iran after revolution. Her work refers to the social, cultural and religious
codes of Islamic society and the complexity of certain oppositions, such as man and woman. The plight of Iranian women is the subject usually she focussed on.
She has also made more narrative one woman show in theatre, such as her work, Forugh Farokhzad in the garden of memories.
The work of Parvaneh addresses the social, political and psychological dimensions of women's experience in contemporary societies. Although Parvaneh actively resists stereotypical representations of Islam, her artistic objectives are not explicitly polemical. Rather, her work recognizes the complex intellectual and religious forces shaping the identity of Muslim women throughout the world.
She also directed and acted short film, such as Stoning, A passion for life, Land legs...
While she lives in London, she addresses a global audience with her work like Fear of Separation was symbolic of her personal grief, anxiety and the pain of those women who scared of separation. As time progressed and the Islamic regime of Iran became more intrusive and oppressive, her work became more boldly political and subversively critical against it, for example, Once upon a time in my country Iran, and Mr, Bin Laden Journeys and Women.
She seeks to, according to an article in New Left Review and Iran Bulitan Journal, women are a lost link in Iranian cinema. Her current theatre work continues to express the philosophical as well as complex levels of intellectual abstraction.
Parvaneh was profiled her website Art and Heart expression in March 2005. In July 2009 she created her dance theatre Nada's Story in protest of the 2009 Iranian presidential election.

Film and  theater experience

2014 Miss Butterfly written and Directed for puppet show
2012 Nzaly Theater, Written, directed
2011 City of Stories  Written and directed 
2010 Zeal in Exile/Performed/ Theater
2009 Neda's Story Dance Theater Written, directed and performed
2008 Mr Bin's Journey/Written, directed and performed /Dance -Theater
2006 The Donkey& A Couple Written, directed and performed Theater
2005 Forough in the garden's of memories Theater
2004 Secret Love Written, Directed and Perform Dance Theater
2004 Nikoo's Story Directed & Performed Theater
2003 A Molah at a Secret Place Dance Theater – Written, Directed and Performed
2003 Land Legs Played Film
2003 Artists in Exile Played Theatre
2002 Once Upon a Time in My Country, Theatre – Written, Direct & Performed
2001 A Modern Woman in 2000 Dance Theatre – Written, Direct & Performed
2001 Waiting Played Theatre
2000 A Woman Alone Direct & Performed Theatre
2000 Islamic Fashion Show in Paris 2000 Theatre – Written, Directed & Performed
1999 An Interview with “Eva” Directed &Performed Theatre
1999 A passion for Life Written & Directed Film
1997 Guilty for Loving Written & Directed Theatre
1996 Butterfly in Fist Played Theatre
1995 Artists Wives Directed Theatre
1994 Arabian Nights Played Theatre
1992 Rostam & Esfandiar Played Theatre
1987 Terror & Misery of the Third Reich Directed Theatre
1982 Can't Pay, Don't Pay Assistant Director Theatre
1981 Round Heads& Sharp Heads Played Theatre
1980 Exception & Rules Played Theatre
1979 Joan Dark Played Theatre

References

1961 births
Living people
People from Tehran
Iranian emigrants to the United Kingdom
Writers from London
Iranian dramatists and playwrights
Iranian theatre directors